Michael Lindsey (born July 10, 1987) is an American football wide receiver who is currently a free agent. He has played for the Tampa Bay Storm and Jacksonville Sharks.

Professional career

Tampa Bay Storm
In 2011, Lindsey signed with the Tampa Bay Storm. He had a tremendous rookie season with the Storm, shattering the franchise record for kickoff return yards in a single season. He re-signed with the Storm for the 2012 season.

Jacksonville Sharks
On August 13, 2015, Lindsey was assigned to the Jacksonville Sharks.

Tampa Bay Storm
On June 16, 2016, Lindsey was assigned to the Storm.. On July 8, 2016, Lindsey was placed on reassignment. He was assigned to the Storm on January 12, 2017. The Storm folded in December 2017.

References

External links
 Tampa Bay Storm Bio

1987 births
Living people
American football wide receivers
Northwest Mississippi Rangers football players
Tampa Bay Storm players
Jacksonville Sharks players